Gonzalo Nápoli Soria (born 8 May 2000) is a Uruguayan footballer who plays as a midfielder for River Plate in Uruguayan Primera División.

Club career

Defensor Sporting
On 24 January 2019, Nápoli made his professional debut against Club Bolívar in 2019 Copa Libertadores.

Honours
Uruguay U20
 South American Games silver medal: 2018

References

Living people
2000 births
Uruguayan sportspeople of Italian descent
Uruguayan footballers
Association football midfielders
Defensor Sporting players
Club Atlético River Plate (Montevideo) players
South American Games silver medalists for Uruguay
South American Games medalists in football